Dékati is a town in the Haraze Mangueigne Department in the Salamat Region of eastern Chad.

Populated places in Chad
Salamat Region